Chuma Municipality is the first municipal section of the Muñecas Province in the  La Paz Department, Bolivia. Its seat is Chuma. Another populated place is Chajlaya.

References 
 www.ine.gov.bo / census 2001: Chuma Municipality

External links 
 Map of the Muñecas Province

Municipalities of La Paz Department (Bolivia)